Bridget Ann Brink is an American diplomat serving as the United States Ambassador to Ukraine. In April 2022, she was nominated by President Joe Biden to be the United States ambassador to Ukraine, and presented her credentials in May 2022. She previously served as the United States Ambassador to Slovakia from August 20, 2019, until May 18, 2022.

Early life and education
Brink is a native of Michigan, the daughter of John and Gwen Brink. She graduated from East Grand Rapids High School in 1987. Brink earned a Bachelor of Arts degree in political science from Kenyon College and a master's in international relations and political theory from the London School of Economics.

Career 
After joining the United States Department of State in 1996, Brink served as a consular political officer in the U.S. Embassy in Belgrade from 1997 to 1999. She then served as a Cyprus desk officer until 2002, and as a special assistant for Europe to the Under Secretary of State for Political Affairs until 2004. From 2005 to 2008, Brink served as political-economic chief in Tbilisi. 

Later, Brink became the deputy director for southern European affairs at the U.S. Department of State before joining the United States National Security Council as director for the Aegean and South Caucasus, where she helped coordinate U.S. foreign policy and advance U.S. interests with Turkey, Greece, Cyprus, Georgia, Azerbaijan, and Armenia. In 2011, Brink returned to Georgia as deputy chief of mission at the U.S. Embassy in Tbilisi.

Brink served as deputy chief of mission at the U.S. Embassy in Tashkent, Uzbekistan from 2014 until August 2015, when she became deputy assistant secretary in the Bureau of European and Eurasian Affairs. In 2018, Foreign Policy reported that Brink was slated to be nominated as the US ambassador to Georgia, but the Georgian Dream government rebuffed her due to her alleged predisposition toward former Georgian President and then-opposition leader Mikheil Saakashvili.

Ambassador to Slovakia
President Donald Trump nominated Brink to become the ambassador to Slovakia. Hearings were held before the Senate Foreign Relations Committee on May 16, 2019. The committee favorably reported her nomination to the Senate floor on May 22, 2019. Brink was confirmed by the entire Senate via voice vote on May 23, 2019.

Brink presented her credentials to President Zuzana Čaputová on August 20, 2019.

Ambassador to Ukraine

In February 2022, it was reported that President Joe Biden would nominate Brink as the United States ambassador to Ukraine. On April 25, 2022, Brink was nominated to serve in that position. Hearings took place on May 10, 2022, before the Senate Foreign Relations Committee. On May 18, 2022, the committee reported her favorably to the Senate floor. Her nomination process was fast-tracked and she was unanimously confirmed by the entire Senate via voice vote later that day. She presented her credentials on May 30, 2022, and took office during the 2022 Russian invasion of Ukraine.

Russian invasion of Ukraine 
Brink has supported Ukraine throughout the 2022 Russian invasion of Ukraine. On July 22, Brink stated that the United States would continue to "support Ukraine for as long as it takes." She made these statements after the White House announced they would send $270 million for military assistance to Ukraine. On July 26, she met with Jonathan Markovitch, the Chief Rabbi of Kyiv. In December it was reported that she had met with President Zelensky in person to securely coordinate his 9.5 hour visit to Washington, D.C. on December 23.

Personal life
She is the mother of two boys, and her husband, Nicholas Higgins, also works for the U.S. Foreign Service. Brink speaks English, Russian, Serbian, Georgian and French.

See also
List of current ambassadors of the United States

References

External links

 
|-

21st-century American diplomats
21st-century American women
Alumni of the London School of Economics
Ambassadors of the United States to Slovakia
Ambassadors of the United States to Ukraine
American women ambassadors
Date of birth missing (living people)
Kenyon College alumni
Living people
People from East Grand Rapids, Michigan
United States Foreign Service personnel
Year of birth missing (living people)
American women diplomats